Sarcoid may refer to:

 Sarcoidosis, a multi-organ immune system disorder characterised by non-necrotising granulomas commonly affecting the lungs and eyes
 Equine sarcoids or sarcoids, common, usually benign, skin tumours of horses and other equidae which have several different forms